was a Japanese actor. He is known as an actor who often played villains, but is famous for playing the role of detective Daisaku Tani in the popular detective drama Seibu Keisatsu.

Fujioka started his acting career at the Haiyuza Theatre Company. His film debut was in the 1961 film A New Wind Over the Mountain Pass directed by Seijun Suzuki. Following year, he signed his contract with Nikkatsu film company.

Filmography

Films

 A New Wind Over the Mountain Pass (1961)
 Story of a Prostitute (1965) as Kimura
 Abare Kishidō (1965) as Shimizu
 Man Who Causes a Storm (1966) as Mochinaga
 Massacre Gun (1967) as Kanayama
 The Militarists (1970) as Nakata
 Men and War (1970) as Seishirō Itagaki
 Yakuza Deka (1970) as Chief Detective
 Yakuza Cop 3: Poison Gas Affair (1971) as Furuya
 Battle of Okinawa (1971) as major general Sanada
 Zatoichi in Desperation (1972) as Inokichi
 Yakuza tai G-men Otori (1973) as Matsuji Matsukawa
 Karafuto 1945 Summer Hyosetsu no Mon (1973) as Regimental Commander Shimizu
 The Last Samurai (1974) as Ikizō Murata
 Cops vs. Thugs (1975) as Ikeda
 The Gate of Youth (1975) as Kijima
 Fumō Chitai (1976) as Army Chief General of Kwantung Army
 Yakuza Graveyard (1976) as Investigative section manager Kojima
 Doberman Cop (1977) as Takeo Sano
 Ashita no Joe (1980) as Danpei Tange (voice)
 Yakyū-kyō no Uta (1988) as Tokyo Mets owner Matsukawa
 Theater of Life (1983) as Sugigen
 Fire Festival (1985) as coolie
 The Second is a Christian (1985) as Hakamada
 Sure Death 4: Revenge (1987) as Minami-machi-bugyō
 226/Four Days of Snow and Blood (1989) as Hisaichi Terauchi
 Under Aurora (1990)

Television drama

 Minamoto no Yoshitsune (1966) as Adachi Saburō Kiyotsune
 Moeyo Ken (1970) as Endō
 Kogarashi Monjirō (1972) (ep.5) as Gennosuke
 Nemuri Kyōshirō (1972) (ep.2) 
 Lone Wolf and Cub (1973) (ep.9) as Tsunehei
 Oshizamurai Kiichihōgan (1973) (ep.1) as Jūbei
 The Water Margin (1973) (ep.3) as Shi Qian
 Zatoichi (1974) (ep.6) as Yasugorō
 Taiyō ni Hoero! (1974) (ep.119) as Fukushima, (1985) (ep.636) as Kōzō Nagata
 G-Men '75 (1975) (ep.27) as Chief of Investigation Headquarters Sapporo police station, (1977) (ep.105) as Nakahara
 Hissatsu Shiokiya Kagyō (1975) (ep.8) as Iseya
 Daitsuiseki (1978) (ep.2)
 Edo Professional Hissatsu Shōbainin (1978) (ep.9) as Okuraya
 Seibu Keisatsu (1979-82) as Daisaku Tani
 Hissatsu Shigotonin III (1983) (ep.29) as Dengorō
 Hissatsu Masshigura! (1986) as Mukojima Jinjurō
 Papa wa Newscaster (1987) as director of The Press
 Sanbiki ga Kiru! (1988) (ep.14)as kiheiji
 Onihei Hankachō (1989) as Sakizō
 Shogun Iemitsu Shinobi Tabi special (1990) as Fuyukichi

References

External links
 

Japanese male film actors
20th-century Japanese male actors
1933 births
1991 deaths